The European Journal of Personality (EJP) is the official bimonthly academic journal of the European Association of Personality Psychology covering research on personality, published by SAGE Publishing. According to citation reports based on impact factor, the journal ranked seventh of all the empirical journals in the social-personality field. EJP seeks to promote the development of empirical and theoretical work in personality psychology. It publishes papers relevant to advancing the field of personality in the broadest sense, and encompasses topics such as the nature of personality, expressions of personality in a social context, personality development, and the consequences of personality. EJP also publishes work on methodological advances in research on personality. It is abstracted inservices including PsycINFO and Social Sciences Citation Index.

EJP introduced two new options in the submission process in 2018. The journal now encourages authors to submit registered reports. In a registered report, "authors create a study proposal that includes theoretical and empirical background, research questions/hypotheses, and pilot data (if available). Upon submission, this proposal will then be reviewed prior to data collection, and if accepted, the paper resulting from this peer-reviewed procedure will be published, regardless of the study outcomes". The journal also allows for streamlined review, a process in which a paper that was previously rejected elsewhere can be sent in along with the original decision letter and the reviews. These documents can then be used as additional information by the editors at the EJP.

EJP also seeks to increase the visibility of its papers through their blog and social media accounts. The blog is focused on highlighting the work of its authors through interviews, press releases, and journal updates. The blog also serves as a platform for researchers to write guest articles about their empirical work and research interests. The articles are usually written in a less technical style, suitable for a lay audience. In 2021, EJP also started to produce a Newsletter which is shared via the blog, and which provides summaries of every research article in the most recent journal issue.

References

External links
European Association of Personality Psychology Homepage

Personality journals
Bimonthly journals
Publications established in 1987
English-language journals
SAGE Publishing academic journals
Differential psychology journals
Academic journals associated with international learned and professional societies of Europe